Doctors of BC, formally known as the British Columbia Medical Association (BCMA), is a professional organization that represents 14,000 physicians, medical residents and medical students in the province of British Columbia. Its goals are to promote a social, economic, and political climate in which members can provide the citizens of BC with the highest standard of health care, while achieving maximum professional satisfaction and fair economic reward. Membership is voluntary.

Doctors of BC represents physicians in negotiations with the BC government. It also advocates for physicians and promotes health and wellness for BC residents. Doctors of BC is a partner with the BC government on the Joint Collaborative Committees (JCCs) which are designed to improve the health care system with the goal of providing quality patient care.

Governance 
Doctors of BC has a dual-structure governance model that consists of a Representative Assembly to ensure members' views are fully represented and a Board of Directors that has the legal and fiduciary responsibility to manage the affairs of the Association. The annually elected President serves as the primary spokesperson.

History
Doctors of BC was founded in January 1900 as the BC Medical Association with Dr R.E. McKechnie, a surgeon from Nanaimo, as President. In 2014, the BCMA adopted the name Doctors of BC.

Publications 
British Columbia Medical Journal

The British Columbia Medical Journal is a peer-reviewed general medical journal covering scientific research, review articles, and updates on contemporary clinical practices written by British Columbian physicians or focused on topics likely to be of interest to them.  It is funded through Doctors of BC is editorially independent. It is published 10 times per year.

Arms

See also

Canadian Medical Association

References

External links
 Doctors of BC

Medical and health organizations based in British Columbia
Professional associations based in British Columbia
Medical associations based in Canada
Organizations based in Vancouver
1900 establishments in British Columbia